Deadline to Disaster is a documentary program on The Weather Channel that premiered on May 3, 2020. In this series, eyewitnesses capture the full fury of extreme weather on camera. (e.g. Tornadoes, Hurricanes, Flash Floods) The third season premieres on November 19, 2022.

Episodes

References 

The Weather Channel original programming
2020 American television series debuts
2020s American documentary television series
English-language television shows